Iakob Gogebashvili Telavi State University is an educational institution located in Telavi, one of the oldest and picturesque cities in Kakheti, Eastern Georgia. It is named after the eminent 19th-century Georgian writer and educator Iakob Gogebashvili.

References 

Universities in Georgia (country)
Educational institutions with year of establishment missing